Longares is a municipality located in the province of Zaragoza, Aragon, Spain. According to the 2004 census (INE), the municipality has a population of 906 inhabitants.

The Cabezo de Altomira hill, a conspicuous landmark in the flat landscape, can be seen NW of the town.

References

Municipalities in the Province of Zaragoza